The yellow mottled coqui (Eleutherodactylus lentus) is a species of frog in the family Eleutherodactylidae endemic to the US Virgin Islands. Its natural habitat is subtropical or tropical dry forests.
It is threatened by habitat loss.

References

Sources
 Cope, E.D. 1862. On some new and little known American Anura. Proc. Acad. Nat. Sci. Philadelphia, vol. 14, pp. 151–159.

Eleutherodactylus
Endemic fauna of the United States Virgin Islands
Amphibians of the United States Virgin Islands
Amphibians described in 1862
Taxonomy articles created by Polbot